Nikola Dragutinović (born 22 April 1991) is a Serbian actor.

Career
Dragutinović appeared in the 2015 Serbian film Pored Mene (Next to Me), directed by Stevan Filipović.

Previously he played Sone in the 2012 drama Clip.

TV roles in Serbia have included the first season of TV series Military Academy (Vojna Akademija) (2012) and Emergency Center (2015).

He also appeared in Artiljer (2012), directed by Srdja Andjelić and played Gavrilo Princip in a drama-doc.

Nikola graduated from the Academy of Arts, Belgrade in 2015, under the tutelage of Serbian actress Mirjana Karanović.

His latest theatre role is in Dear Dad (2016), directed by Mirjana Karanović and written by Milena Bogavac, at Belgrade’s Children’s Cultural Centre.

References

21st-century Serbian male actors
1991 births
Male actors from Belgrade
Living people
Serbian male film actors
Serbian male stage actors